The feeler fish, Bathypterois longifilis, a grinner of the family Ipnopidae, is found around Australia and New Zealand.

References
 
 
 Tony Ayling & Geoffrey Cox, Collins Guide to the Sea Fishes of New Zealand,  (William Collins Publishers Ltd, Auckland, New Zealand 1982) 

Ipnopidae
Fish described in 1878
Taxa named by Albert Günther